Reiden Patera is a volcanic feature on Jupiter's moon Io. It was first detected by the Galileo SSI Team during the spacecraft Galileo's first orbit around Jupiter, initially detected as a hotspot. It was once thought that the activity there had stopped or waned below the limits of the spacecraft's Solid State Imager or Near-Infrared Mapping Spectrometer. However, it was noticed in 2002 that Reiden Patera has darkened considerably since the 24th orbit of Galileo. It has been spouting bright red pyroclastic deposits of its own. It is named after a Japanese thunder god ("Raijin" in current English nomenclature). Asha Patera can be found to the east, and Kami-Nari Patera can be found to the north.

References

Volcanoes of Io (moon)
Active volcanoes